Semaun (approx. 1899—1971), also spelled Semaoen, was the first chairman of the Communist Party of Indonesia (PKI) and was a leader of the Semarang branch of the Sarekat Islam.

Early life
Semaun was born in Curahmalang, Jombang, East Java. In 1915 at the age of sixteen, he was elected as one of the first Indonesian members of the Union of Train and Tramway Personnel (VSTP), soon quitting his job as a railway worker to become a trade union activist full-time.  At the same time, he was elected vice-chairman of the Surabaya office of the Indies Social Democratic Association (ISDV), which was to become the Indonesian Communist Party or PKI. By 1918 he was a member of the central leadership of Sarekat Islam (SI), then the dominant nationalist political organization in the Dutch East Indies.

Communist activities
In 23 May 1920, the Communist Party of Indonesia (originally the Partai Komunis Hindia, changed to 'Indonesia' a few months later) was founded after the deportation of the Dutch founders of the ISDV. Semaun became its first chairman. The PKI initially was a part of Sarekat Islam, but political differences over the role of class struggle and of Islam in nationalism between Semaun's PKI and the rest of SI led to an organizational split by October. At the end of that year he left Indonesia for Moscow, and Tan Malaka replaced him as chairman. Upon his return in May 1922, he regained the chairmanship and tried, with limited success, to restore PKI influence over the sprawling SI organization. 

In 1923 VSTP, the railway union, organized a general strike. It was soon crushed by the Dutch government, and Semaun was exiled from the Indies. He returned to the Soviet Union, where he was to remain for more than thirty years. He remained involved as a nationalist activist on a limited basis, speaking a few times to Perhimpunan Indonesia, a Netherlands-based organization of Indonesian students. He also studied at the Communist University of the Toilers of the East for a time. He travelled extensively in Europe, and played a role in leadership in Tajikistan in the Soviet era. He wrote a novel, Hikayat Kadirun, which combined communist and Islamic ideals, and produced a number of pamphlets and newspaper articles.

Upon his return to Indonesia after its independence, Semaun moved to Jakarta, where from 1959 to 1961 he served on a government advisory board. He was rejected by the new leadership of the PKI, and was affiliated to the Murba Party (Proletarian Party), which was opposed to the PKI. He also taught economics at Universitas Padjadjaran in Bandung. He died in Jakarta in 1971.

References
Jarvis, Helen (1991). Notes and appendices for Tan Malaka, From Jail to Jail. Athens, Ohio: Ohio University Center for International Studies.
Kahin, George McT. (1952) Nationalism and revolution in Indonesia. Ithaca, New York:Cornell University Press.
McVey, Ruth. (1965) The Rise of Indonesian Communism. Ithaca, Cornell University Press.
Ricklefs, M.C. (2001) A history of modern Indonesia since c.1200 3rd ed. Stanford, California:Stanford University Press.
Vickers, Adrian (2012) A history of modern Indonesia 2nd ed. Cambridge University Press.

1890s births
1971 deaths
Communist Party of Indonesia politicians
Indonesian expatriates in the Soviet Union
People granted political asylum in the Soviet Union
Indonesian newspaper editors
Newspaper editors from the Dutch East Indies
Dutch political prisoners
Sarekat Islam politicians